Ninaikka Therintha Maname is a 1987 Indian Tamil-language romance film directed by Suresh and written by K. Dinakar. Based on the novel Vaazhthum Nenjangal by Manian, the film stars Mohan, Chandrasekhar and Rupini. It was released on 14 August 1987.

Plot

Cast 
 Mohan
 Chandrasekhar
 Rupini
 Kallapetti Singaram
 Loose Mohan
 Haja Sheriff
 Idichapuli Selvaraj

Soundtrack 
The music was composed by Ilaiyaraaja, with lyrics by Kamakodiyan. Ilaiyaraaja's elder son Karthik Raja, then aged 13, played the keyboard for the song "Kannukkum".

Release and reception 
Ninaikka Therintha Maname was released on 14 August 1987. The Indian Express wrote, "The simple knot of the novel is overburdened with songs (especially), and fights. It might have helped if the film was shorter, and the treatment austere and aesthetic". Jeyamanmadhan of Kalki found Ilaiyaraaja's music as the only saving grace of the film.

References

External links 
 

1980s romance films
1980s Tamil-language films
Films based on Indian novels
Films scored by Ilaiyaraaja
Indian romance films